Sokolniki District is a district of the Eastern Administrative Okrug of the federal city of Moscow located in the north-east corner of the city. Population:

Etymology
Sokolniki derives its name from the word "" (sokol,  meaning "falcon") in view of the Tsar's falcon hunting grounds which were located there, primarily on the territory of the present-day Sokolniki Park. The district also provides the name for one of its metro stations: Sokolniki Metro Station.

Sports
The district is home to the FC and HC Spartak Moscow. The latter plays its games in the Sokolniki Sports Palace located within Sokolniki Park.

Miscellaneous
 
In 2006, after twenty years of construction and changing ownership, a twenty-storey hotel finally opened overlooking the Sokolniki metro station and Sokolniki Square. This hotel is now the Holiday Inn Sokolniki.

In Tolstoy's War and Peace, Pierre fights a duel in Sokolniki.

The Elite House in Sokolniki will soon be one of the largest buildings in the world with DuPont Tyvek used as a weather and water barrier.

References

Districts of Moscow
Eastern Administrative Okrug